Percy Jones may refer to:

 Percy L. Jones (1875–1941), US Army Medical Corps officer
 Percy Jones (rugby union) (1887–1969), Welsh international rugby player
 Percy Mansell Jones (1889–1968), Welsh professor of French at Bangor and Manchester Universities
 Percy Jones (boxer) (1892–1922), Welsh world champion flyweight in 1914
 Percy Jones (baseball) (1899–1979), American baseball player
 Percy Jones (footballer) (1908–1960), Australian rules footballer for Geelong
 Percy Jones (musician) (born 1947), Welsh bass guitarist

See also
 Peter Jones (Australian rules footballer) (born 1946), known as Percy, Australian rules footballer and coach for Carlton